Fire in Hell is a 2012 South Korean drama film written and directed by South Korean indie provocateur Lee Sang-woo. Based on a true story, it made its world premiere at the 13th Jeonju International Film Festival and its international premiere at the 34th Moscow International Film Festival in 2012.

Synopsis
Ji-wol (Won Tae-hee), a Buddhist monk, is banished from his temple for sexual misconduct with a female devotee. He returns home, but ends up raping Yeon-seo (Cha Seung-min) and accidentally killing her. Guilt-ridden, he travels to Philippines to return Yeon-seo's ashes to her family.

Cast
 Won Tae-hee as Ji-wol 
 Cha Seung-min as Yeon-hwa/Yeon-seo
 Kim Hun as Yong-hae
 Song Jin-yeol as Pastor
 Lee Yong-nyeo as Ji-wol's mother
 Lee Tae-rim as Ji-won 
 Lee Sang-woo as Zealot 1
 Song Jin-yeol

Reception

References

External links
 
 
 

2012 films
South Korean drama films
2010s Korean-language films
Films directed by Lee Sang-woo
2010s South Korean films